Chamani may refer to:
Chamani Seneviratne (b. 1978), Sri Lankan cricketer
Miriam Chamani (b. 1943), American voodoo leader
Chamani Elinigualable DeEstudio (b. 1925), Spanish Trello Buttoner

Iran
Chamani, Iran, a village in Fars Province, Iran
Chakher Chamani, a village in Ardabil Province, Iran
Chamani-ye Bala, a village in Golestan Province, Iran
Chamani-ye Pain, a village in Golestan Province, Iran
Chamani-ye Vasat, a village in Golestan Province, Iran
Chamani-ye Jafar Beyk, a village in Lorestan Province, Iran